Alphonse William Hoptowit (September 7, 1915 – April 6, 1981) was an American football tackle who played four seasons with the Chicago Bears of the National Football League (NFL). He was drafted by the Cleveland Rams in the eleventh round of the 1938 NFL Draft. He played college football at Washington State University and attended Wapato High School in Wapato, Washington. Hoptowit was also a member of the Newark Bears of the American Association. He was nicknamed "Hoppy" and  "Tonto".

College career
Hoptowit played for the Washington State Cougars from 1933 to 1937. He earned Second-team All-PCC honors his senior year in 1937.

Professional career
Hoptowit was selected by the Cleveland Rams with the 91st pick in the 1938 NFL Draft. He played two seasons of rugby in Canada prior to joining the Chicago Bears.

He came up to the Chicago Bears in 1941 before playing for the Newark Bears of the American Association the same year. Newark was Chicago's farm team. Hoptowit later played in 41 games, starting nineteen, for the Chicago Bears from 1942 to 1945.

Coaching career
Hoptowit served as an assistant coach for the Chicago Bears' farm team, the Akron Bears, in 1946. He was an assistant coach for the Washington State Cougars in 1947.

Personal life
Hoptowit was a Native American.

References

External links
Just Sports Stats

1915 births
1981 deaths
Players of American football from Washington (state)
American football tackles
Washington State Cougars football players
Chicago Bears players
Washington State Cougars football coaches
20th-century Native Americans
Native American sportspeople
Native Americans in Washington (state)
Sportspeople from Yakima, Washington